Das Wagner Desaster Live is the thirtieth album by Klaus Schulze. It was originally released in 1994, and in 2005 was the fifteenth Schulze album reissued by Revisited Records. The reissue of Das Wagner Desaster Live is one of two examples of a Klaus Schulze reissue that changes the original order of the tracks (the other being Audentity). Das Wagner Desaster Live was released after Schulze's Silver Edition 10-disc CD box set, technically making this album his fortieth.

Track listing
All tracks composed by Klaus Schulze.

Disc 1

Disc 2

Personnel
Klaus Schulze – synthesizer, guitar, keyboards, voices, producer, computers, sampling, mixing, concept, Mini Moog
Akai Adam – assistant engineer
Werner Eggert – engineer, crew
Dennis Lakey – sampling

References

External links
 Das Wagner Desaster Live at the official site of Klaus Schulze
 

1994 live albums
Live electronica albums
Klaus Schulze live albums